The early history of slavery in the Indian subcontinent is contested because it depends on the translations of terms such as dasa and dasyu. Greek writer Megasthenes in his work Indika, while describing the Maurya Empire states that slavery was banned in Indian society. The Buddhist Vanijja Sutta, AN 5:177 listing slave trading to be one of the five wrong livelihood a layperson should not engage in the :

Slavery in India escalated during the Muslim domination of northern India after the 11th century, when Muslim rulers re-introduced slavery to the Indian subcontinent. It became a predominant social institution with the enslavement of Hindus, along with the use of slaves in armies for conquest, a long-standing practice within Muslim kingdoms at the time. According to Muslim historians of the Delhi Sultanate and the Mughal Empire era, after the invasions of Hindu kingdoms, other Indians were taken as slaves, with many exported to Central Asia and West Asia. Many slaves from the Horn of Africa were also imported into the Indian subcontinent to serve in the households of the powerful or the Muslim armies of the Deccan Sultanates and the Mughal Empire.

Slavery in India continued through the 18th and 19th centuries. During the colonial era, Indians were taken into different parts of the world as slaves by various European merchant companies as part of the Indian Ocean slave trade. Over a million indentured labourers (referred to as girmitiyas) from the Indian subcontinent were transported to various European colonies in Africa, Asia, and the Americas to labour on plantations and mines. The Portuguese imported Africans into their Indian colonies on the Konkan coast between about 1530 and 1740. Slavery was abolished in the possessions of the East India Company by the Indian Slavery Act, 1843.

Slavery in Ancient India
The term dāsa and dāsyu in Vedic and other ancient Indian literature has been interpreted by as "servant" or "slave", but others have contested such meaning. The term dāsa in the Rigveda, has been also been translated as an enemy, but overall the identity of this term remains unclear and disputed among scholars. 

According to Scott Levi, it was likely an established institution in ancient India by the start of the common era based on texts such as the Arthashastra, the Manusmriti and the Mahabharata. Slavery was "likely widespread by the lifetime of the Buddha and perhaps even as far back as the Vedic period", however he elaborates that the association of the Vedic Dasa with 'slaves' is "problematic and likely to have been a later development".

Upinder Singh states that the Rig Veda is familiar with slavery, referring to enslavement in course of war or as a result of debt. She states that the use of dasa (Sanskrit: दास) and dasi in later times were used as terms for male and female slaves. In contrast, Suvira Jaiswal states that dasa tribes were integrated in the lineage system of Vedic traditions, wherein dasi putras could rise to the status of priests, warriors and chiefs as shown by the examples of Kaksivant Ausija, Balbutha, Taruksa, Divodasa and others. Some scholars contest the earlier interpretations of the term dasa as "slave", with or without "racial distinctions". According to Indologists Stephanie W. Jamison and Joel P. Brereton, known for their recent translation of the Rigveda, the dasa and dasyu are human and non-human beings who are enemies of Arya. These according to the Rigveda, state Jamison and Brereton, are destroyed by the Vedic deity Indra. The interpretation of "dasas as slaves" in the Vedic era is contradicted by hymns such as 2.12 and 8.46 that describe "wealthy dasas" who charitably give away their wealth. Similarly, state Jamison and Brereton, the "racial distinctions" are not justified by the evidence. According to the Indologist Thomas Trautmann, the relationship between the Arya and Dasa appears only in two verses of the Rigveda, is vague and unexpected since the Dasa were "in some ways more economically advanced" than the Arya according to the textual evidence.

According to Asko Parpola, the term dasa in ancient Indian texts has proto-Saka roots, where dasa or daha simply means "man". Both "dasa" and "dasyu" are uncommon in Indo-Iranian languages (including Sanskrit and Pali), and these words may be a legacy of the PIE root "*dens-", and the word "saka" may have evolved from "dasa", states Parpola. According to Micheline Ishay – a professor of human rights studies and sociology, the term "dasa" can be "translated as slave". The institution represented unfree labor with fewer rights, but "the supposed slavery in [ancient] India was of mild character and limited extent" like Babylonian and Hebrew slavery, in contrast to the Hellenic world. The "unfree labor" could be of two types in ancient India: the underadsatva and the ahitaka, states Ishay. A person in distress could pledge themselves for work leading to underadsatava, while under ahitaka a person's "unfree labor" was pledged or mortgaged against a debt or ransom when captured during a war. These forms of slavery limited the duration of "unfree labor" and such a slave had rights to their property and could pass their property to their kin, states Ishay.

The term dasa appears in early Buddhist texts, a term scholars variously interpret as servant or slave. Buddhist manuscripts also mention kapyari, which scholars have translated as a legally bonded servant (slave). According to Gregory Schopen, in the Mahaviharin Vinaya, the Buddha says that a community of monks may accept dasa for repairs and other routine chores. Later, the same Buddhist text states that the Buddha approved the use of kalpikara and the kapyari for labor in the monasteries and approved building separate quarters for them. Schopen interprets the term dasa as servants, while he interprets the kalpikara and kapyari as bondmen and slave respectively because they can be owned and given by laity to the Buddhist monastic community. According to Schopen, since these passages are not found in Indian versions of the manuscripts, but found in a Sri Lankan version, these sections may have been later interpolations that reflect a Sri Lankan tradition, rather than early Indian. The discussion of servants and bonded labor is also found in manuscripts found in Tibet, though the details vary.

The discussion of servant, bonded labor and slaves, states Scopen, differs significantly in different manuscripts discovered for the same Buddhist text in India, Nepal and Tibet, whether they are in Sanskrit or Pali language. These Buddhist manuscripts present a set of questions to ask a person who wants to become a monk or nun. These questions inquire if the person is a dasa and dasi, but also ask additional questions such as "are you ahrtaka" and "are you vikritaka". The later questions have been interpreted in two ways. As "are you one who has been seized" (ahrtaka) and "are you one who has been sold" (vikritaka) respectively, these terms are interpreted as slaves. Alternatively, they have also been interpreted as "are you doubtless" and "are you blameworthy" respectively, which does not mean slave. Further, according to these texts, Buddhist monasteries refused all servants, bonded labor and slaves an opportunity to become a monk or nun, but accepted them as workers to serve the monastery.

The Indian texts discuss dasa and bonded labor along with their rights, as well as a monastic community's obligations to feed, clothe and provide medical aid to them in exchange for their work. This description of rights and duties in Buddhist Vinaya texts, says Schopen, parallel those found in Hindu Dharmasutra and Dharmasastra texts. The Buddhist attitude to servitude or slavery as reflected in Buddhist texts, states Schopen, may reflect a "passive acceptance" of cultural norms of the Brahmanical society midst them, or more "justifiably an active support" of these institutions. The Buddhist texts offer "no hint of protest or reform" to such institutions, according to Schopen.

Kautilya's Arthashastra dedicates the thirteenth chapter on dasas, in his third book on law. This Sanskrit document from the Maurya Empire period (4th century BCE) has been translated by several authors, each in a different manner. Shamasastry's translation of 1915 maps dasa as slave, while Kangle leaves the words as dasa and karmakara. According to Kangle's interpretation, the verse 13.65.3–4 of Arthasastra forbids any slavery of "an Arya in any circumstances whatsoever", but allows the Mlecchas to "sell an offspring or keep it as pledge". Patrick Olivelle agrees with this interpretation. He adds that an Arya or Arya family could pledge itself during times of distress into bondage, and these bonded individuals could be converted to slave if they committed a crime thereby differing with Kangle's interpretation. According to Kangle, the Arthasastra forbids enslavement of minors and Arya from all four varnas and this inclusion of Shudras stands different from the Vedic literature. Kangle suggests that the context and rights granted to dasa by Kautilya implies that the word had a different meaning than the modern word slave, as well as the meaning of the word slave in Greek or other ancient and medieval civilizations. According to Arthashastra, anyone who had been found guilty of nishpatitah (Sanskrit: निष्पातित, ruined, bankrupt, a minor crime) may mortgage oneself to become dasa for someone willing to pay his or her bail and employ the dasa for money and privileges.

The term dasa in Indic literature when used as a suffix to a bhagavan (deity) name, refers to a pious devotee.

Slavery in Medieval India
Slavery was brought during the medieval era with the Muslim conquests of the Indian subcontinent. Wink summarizes the period as follows,

Unlike other parts of the medieval Muslim world, slavery was not widespread in Kashmir. Except for the Sultans, there is no evidence the elite kept slaves. The Kashmiris despised slavery. Concubinage was also not practised.

Islamic invasions (8th to 12th century AD)

Andre Wink summarizes the slavery in 8th and 9th century India as follows,

In the early 11th century Tarikh al-Yamini, the Arab historian Al-Utbi recorded that in 1001 the armies of Mahmud of Ghazni conquered Peshawar and Waihand (capital of Gandhara) after Battle of Peshawar (1001), "in the midst of the land of Hindustan", and enslaved thousands. Later, following his twelfth expedition into India in 1018–19, Mahmud is reported to have returned to with such a large number of slaves that their value was reduced to only two to ten dirhams each. This unusually low price made, according to Al-Utbi, "merchants came from distant cities to purchase them, so that the countries of Central Asia, Iraq and Khurasan were swelled with them, and the fair and the dark, the rich and the poor, mingled in one common slavery".

Delhi Sultanate (12th to 16th century AD)

During the Delhi Sultanate period (1206–1555), references to the abundant availability of low-priced Indian slaves abound. Many of these Indian slaves were used by Muslim nobility in the subcontinent, but others were exported to satisfy the demand in international markets. Some slaves were forcibly converted to Islam. Children fathered by Muslim masters on non-Muslim slaves would be raised Muslim. Non-Muslim women, who Muslim soldiers and elites had slept with, would convert to Islam to avoid rejection by their own communities. Scott Levi states that "Movement of considerable numbers of Hindus to the Central Asian slave markets was largely a product of the state building efforts of the Delhi Sultanate and Mughal Empire in South Asia".

The revenue system of the Delhi Sultanate produced a considerable proportion of the Indian slave population as these rulers, and their subordinate shiqadars, ordered their armies to abduct large numbers of locals as a means of extracting revenue. While those communities that were loyal to the Sultan and regularly paid their taxes were often excused from this practice, taxes were commonly extracted from other, less loyal groups in the form of slaves. Thus, according to Barani, the Shamsi "slave-king" Balban (r. 1266–87) ordered his shiqadars in Awadh to enslave those peoples resistant to his authority, implying those who refused to supply him with tax revenue. Sultan Alauddin Khalji (r. 1296–1316) is similarly reported to have legalised the enslavement of those who defaulted on their revenue payments. This policy continued during the Mughal era.

An even greater number of people were enslaved as a part of the efforts of the Delhi Sultans to finance their expansion into new territories. For example, while he himself was still a military slave of the Ghurid Sultan Muizz u-Din, Qutb-ud-din Aybak (r. 1206–10 as the first of the Shamsi slave-kings) invaded Gujarat in 1197 and placed some 20,000 people in bondage. Roughly six years later, he enslaved an additional 50,000 people during his conquest of Kalinjar. Later in the 13th century, Balban's campaign in Ranthambore, reportedly defeated the Indian army and yielded "captives beyond computation".

Levi states that the forcible enslavement of non-Muslims during Delhi Sultanate was motivated by the desire for war booty and military expansion. This gained momentum under the Khalji and Tughluq dynasties, as being supported by available figures. Zia uddin Barani suggested that Sultan Alauddin Khalji owned 50,000 slave-boys, in addition to 70,000 construction slaves. Sultan Firuz Shah Tughluq is said to have owned 180,000 slaves, roughly 12,000 of whom were skilled artisans. A significant proportion of slaves owned by the Sultans were likely to have been military slaves and not labourers or domestics. However earlier traditions of maintaining a mixed army comprising both Indian soldiers and Turkic slave-soldiers (ghilman, mamluks) from Central Asia, were disrupted by the rise of the Mongol Empire reducing the inflow of mamluks. This intensified demands by the Delhi Sultans on local Indian populations to satisfy their need for both military and domestic slaves. The Khaljis even sold thousands of captured Mongol soldiers within India. China, Turkistan, Persia, and Khurusan were sources of male and female slaves sold to Tughluq India. The Yuan Dynasty Emperor in China sent 100 slaves of both sexes to the Tughluq Sultan, and he replied by also sending the same number of slaves of both sexes.

Mughal Empire (16th to 19th century)
The slave trade continued to exist in the Mughal Empire, however it was greatly reduced in scope, primarily limited to domestic servitude and debt bondage, and deemed "mild" and incomparable to the Arab slave trade or transatlantic slave trade.

One Dutch merchant in the 17th century writes about Abd Allah Khan Firuz Jang, an Uzbek noble at the Mughal court during the 1620s and 1630s, who was appointed to the position of governor of the regions of Kalpi and Kher and, in the process of subjugating the local rebels, beheaded the leaders and enslaved their women, daughters and children, who were more than 200,000 in number.

When Shah Shuja was appointed as governor of Kabul, he carried out a war in Indian territory beyond the Indus. Most of the women burnt themselves to death to save their honour. Those captured were "distributed" among Muslim mansabdars. The Augustinian missionary Fray Sebastian Manrique, who was in Bengal in 1629–30 and again in 1640, remarked on the ability of the shiqdār—a Mughal officer responsible for executive matters in the pargana, the smallest territorial unit of imperial administration to collect the revenue demand, by force if necessary, and even to enslave peasants should they default in their payments.

A survey of a relatively small, restricted sample of seventy-seven letters regarding the manumission or sale of slaves in the Majmua-i-wathaiq reveals that slaves of Indian origin (Hindi al-asal) accounted for over fifty-eight percent of those slaves whose region of origin is mentioned. The Khutut-i-mamhura bemahr-i qadat-i Bukhara, a smaller collection of judicial documents from early-eighteenth-century Bukhara, includes several letters of manumission, with over half of these letters referring to slaves "of Indian origin". In the model of a legal letter of manumission written by the chief qazi for his assistant to follow, the example used is of a slave "of Indian origin". Indian slaves continued to be sold in the markets of Bukhara well into the nineteenth century. 

The export of slaves from India was limited to debt defaulters and rebels against the Mughal Empire. The Ghakkars of Punjab acted as intermediaries for such slave for trade to Central Asian buyers.

Fatawa-i Alamgiri

The Fatawa-e-Alamgiri (also known as the Fatawa-i-Hindiya and Fatawa-i Hindiyya) was sponsored by Aurangzeb in the late 17th century. It compiled the law for the Mughal Empire, and involved years of effort by 500 Muslim scholars from South Asia, Iraq and Saudi Arabia. The thirty volumes on Hanafi-based sharia law for the Empire was influential during and after Auruangzeb's rule, and it included many chapters and laws on slavery and slaves in India.

Some of the slavery-related law included in Fatawa-i Alamgiri were,
 the right of Muslims to purchase and own slaves,
 a Muslim man's right to have sex with a captive slave girl he owns or a slave girl owned by another Muslim (with master's consent) without marrying her,
 no inheritance rights for slaves,
 the testimony of all slaves was inadmissible in a court of law
 slaves require permission of the master before they can marry,
 an unmarried Muslim may marry a slave girl he owns but a Muslim married to a Muslim woman may not marry a slave girl,
 conditions under which the slaves may be emancipated partially or fully.

Export of Indian slaves to international markets

Alongside Buddhist Oirats, Christian Russians, Afghans, and the predominantly Shia Iranians, Indian slaves were an important component of the highly active slave markets of medieval and early modern Central Asia. The all pervasive nature of slavery in this period in Central Asia is shown by the 17th century records of one Juybari Sheikh, a Naqshbandi Sufi leader, owning over 500 slaves, forty of whom were specialists in pottery production while the others were engaged in agricultural work. High demand for skilled slaves, and India's larger and more advanced textile industry, agricultural production and tradition of architecture demonstrated to its neighbours that skilled-labour was abundant in the subcontinent leading to enslavement and export of large numbers of skilled labour as slaves, following their successful invasions.

After sacking Delhi, Timur enslaved several thousand skilled artisans, presenting many of these slaves to his subordinate elite, although reserving the masons for use in the construction of the Bibi-Khanym Mosque in Samarkand. Young female slaves fetched higher market price than skilled construction slaves, sometimes by 150%, as they could be kept as sex slaves.

Under early European colonial powers

According to one author, in spite of the best efforts of the slave-holding elite to conceal the continuation of the institution from the historical record, slavery was practised throughout colonial India in various manifestations.

17th century
Slavery existed in Portuguese India after the 16th century. "Most of the Portuguese," says Albert. D. Mandelslo, a German itinerant writer, "have many slaves of both sexes, whom they employ not only on and about their persons, but also upon the business they are capable of, for what they get comes with the master."

Japanese slave girls were still owned by India based Portuguese (Lusitanian) families according to Francisco De Sousa, a Jesuit who wrote about it in 1698, long after the 1636 edict by Tokguawa Japan had expelled Portuguese people.

The Dutch, too, largely dealt in slaves. They were mainly Abyssian, known in India as Habshis or Sheedes. The curious mixed race in Kanara on the West coast has traces of these slaves.

The Dutch Indian Ocean slave trade was primarily mediated by the Dutch East India Company, drawing captive labour from three commercially closely linked regions: the western, or Southeast Africa, Madagascar, and the Mascarene Islands (Mauritius and Reunion); the middle, or Indian subcontinent (Malabar, Coromandel, and the Bengal/Arakan coast); and the eastern, or Malaysia, Indonesia, New Guinea (Irian Jaya), and the southern Philippines.

The Dutch traded slaves from fragmented or weak small states and stateless societies in the East beyond the sphere of Islamic influence, to the company's Asian headquarters, the "Chinese colonial city" of Batavia (Jakarta), and its regional centre in coastal Sri Lanka. Other destinations included the important markets of Malacca (Melaka) and Makassar (Ujungpandang), along with the plantation economies of eastern Indonesia (Maluku, Ambon, and Banda Islands), and the agricultural estates of the southwestern Cape Colony (South Africa).

On the Indian subcontinent, Arakan/Bengal, Malabar, and Coromandel remained the most important source of forced labour until the 1660s. Between 1626 and 1662, the Dutch exported on an average 150–400 slaves annually from the Arakan-Bengal coast. During the first thirty years of Batavia's existence, Indian and Arakanese slaves provided the main labour force of the company's Asian headquarters. Of the 211 manumitted slaves in Batavia between 1646 and 1649, 126 (59.71%) came from South Asia, including 86 (40.76%) from Bengal. Slave raids into the Bengal estuaries were conducted by joint forces of Magh pirates, and Portuguese traders (chatins) operating from Chittagong outside the jurisdiction and patronage of the Estado da India, using armed vessels (galias). These raids occurred with the active connivance of the Taung-ngu (Toungoo) rulers of Arakan. The eastward expansion of the Mughal Empire, however, completed with the conquest of Chittagong in 1666, cut off the traditional supplies from Arakan and Bengal. Until the Dutch seizure of the Portuguese settlements on the Malabar coast (1658–63), large numbers of slaves were also captured and sent from India's west coast to Batavia, Ceylon, and elsewhere. After 1663, however, the stream of forced labour from Cochin dried up to a trickle of about 50–100 and 80–120 slaves per year to Batavia and Ceylon, respectively.

In contrast with other areas of the Indian subcontinent, Coromandel remained the centre of a sporadic slave trade throughout the seventeenth century. In various short-lived expansions accompanying natural and human-induced calamities, the Dutch exported thousands of slaves from the east coast of India. A prolonged period of drought followed by famine conditions in 1618–20 saw the first large-scale export of slaves from the Coromandel coast in the seventeenth century. Between 1622 and 1623, 1,900 slaves were shipped from central Coromandel ports, like Pulicat and Devanampattinam. Company officials on the coast declared that 2,000 more could have been bought if only they had the funds.

The second expansion in the export of Coromandel slaves occurred during a famine following the revolt of the Nayaka Indian rulers of South India (Tanjavur, Senji, and Madurai) against Bijapur overlordship (1645) and the subsequent devastation of the Tanjavur countryside by the Bijapur army. Reportedly, more than 150,000 people were taken by the invading Deccani Muslim armies to Bijapur and Golconda. In 1646, 2,118 slaves were exported to Batavia, the overwhelming majority from southern Coromandel. Some slaves were also acquired further south at Tondi, Adirampatnam, and Kayalpatnam.

A third phase in slaving took place between 1659 and 1661 from Tanjavur as a result of a series of successive Bijapuri raids. At Nagapatnam, Pulicat, and elsewhere, the company purchased 8,000–10,000 slaves, the bulk of whom were sent to Ceylon while a small portion were exported to Batavia and Malacca. A fourth phase (1673–77) started from a long drought in Madurai and southern Coromandel starting in 1673, and intensified by the prolonged Madurai-Maratha struggle over Tanjavur and punitive fiscal practices. Between 1673 and 1677, 1,839 slaves were exported from the Madurai coast alone. A fifth phase occurred in 1688, caused by poor harvests and the Mughal advance into the Karnatak. Thousands of people from Tanjavur, mostly girls and little boys, were sold into slavery and exported by Asian traders from Nagapattinam to Aceh, Johor, and other slave markets. In September 1687, 665 slaves were exported by the East India Company from Fort St. George, Madras. Finally, in 1694–96, when warfare once more ravaged South India, a total of 3,859 slaves were imported from Coromandel by private individuals into Ceylon.

The volume of the total Dutch Indian Ocean slave trade has been estimated to be about 15–30% of the Atlantic slave trade, slightly smaller than the trans-Saharan slave trade, and one-and-a-half to three times the size of the Swahili and Red Sea coast and the Dutch West India Company slave trades.

Slavery in Malabar
The main agrestic slave castes in Malabar were Pulayars, Parayars, Kuruvars, Cherumas. The principal Collector estimated that the Pulayars and Cherumars constituted about half of the slave population. Buchannan in 1801 stated that almost all cultivators were slaves. He stated that the slaves were primarily used for field labouring and the degree of slavery was the worst among the Parayars, Pulayans and Kuravans who were made to work like beasts. Cheruvans and Pulayans were brought to the towns to be bought and sold. The slave population increased by 65 percent in 36 years from 1806 to 1842. Children born to slaves were also made slaves. According to Dr. Francis Buchanan's estimate in 1801 AD, 41,367 people were slaves in the Malabar's south, central, and northern divisions, out of a total population of 292,366. Travancore had 164,864 slaves in 1836, out of a total population of 1,280,668. During the middle of the nineteenth century, Kerala had an estimated 
4.25 lakh slaves.

Social oppression was also part of slavery. They were not allowed to wear clean clothes and were to keep away from the roads of their masters who were Brahmin and Nairs. Major Walker stated that they were left out to nature and abandoned when they suffered from diseases and some times made to stand in rice fields for hours which gave them Rheumatism, Cholera and other diseases. The slaves belonged to the lower castes and were employed only for feudal work, and the stigma that they should be kept away from their masters was strictly followed. Samuel Mateer, noted that even in the working fields the slaves were supervised from a distance. The caste system kept them as untouchables and divided into numerous sub-castes. The condition of the Cherumars was no different in 19th century, the Kerala Patrike in 1898 wrote that the Cherumar slaves had high regards for their masters because the higher castes convinced them that they were obliged at birth to serve the Higher castes.

Between 1871 and 1881, an estimated 40,000 slaves converted to Islam, according to the 1881 census. During this time, many slaves in Cochin and Travancore converted to Christianity. It was stated at the 1882 Christian Mission Conference that the population of Muslim Mapillas was rapidly expanding due to conversions from the lower strata of Hindu society, and that the entire west coast could become Muslim in such a phase.

18th to 20th century
Between 1772 and 1833, debates in the British Parliament recorded the volume of slavery in India. A slave market was noted as operating in Calcutta, and the Company Court House permitted slave ownership to be registered, for a fee of Rs. 4.25 or Rs.4 and 4 annas.

A number of abolitionist missionaries, including Rev. James Peggs, Rev. Howard Malcom, Sir Thomas Fowell Buxton, and William Adams offered commentaries on the Parliamentary debates, and added their own estimates of the numbers effected by, and forms of slavery in South Asia, by region and caste, in the 1830s. In a series of publications that included their: "India’s Cries to British Humanity, Relative to Infanticide, British Connection with Idolatry, Ghau Murders, Suttee, Slavery, and Colonization in India", "Slavery and the slave trade in British India; with notices of the existence of these evils in the islands of Ceylon, Malacca, and Penang, drawn from official documents", and "The Law and Custom of Slavery in British India: In a Series of Letters to Thomas Fowell Buxton, Esq" tables were published detailing the estimates.

The publications have been frequently cited by modern historians when discussing the history of slavery in India, as it included individual letters and reports discussing the practise in various regions throughout India, frequently mentioning the number of people being enslaved:

Historian Andrea Major noted the extent of European involvement in slave trading in India:

Regulation and prohibition
In Bengal, the East India Company (EIC) in 1773 opted to codify the pre-existing pluralistic judicial system, with Europeans subject to common law, Muslims to the sharia based Fatawa-e-Alamgiri, and Hindus to an adaptation of a Dharmaśāstra named Manusmriti, which became known as the Hindu law, with the applicable legal traditions, and for Hindus an interpretation of verse 8.415 of the Manusmriti, regulating the practice of slavery. The EIC later passed regulations 9, and 10 of 1774, prohibiting the trade in slaves without written deed, and the sale of anyone not already enslaved, and reissued the legislation in 1789, after a Danish slave trader, Peter Horrebow, was caught, prosecuted, fined, and jailed for attempting to smuggle 150 Bengali slaves to Dutch Ceylon. The EIC subsequently issued regulations 10 of 1811, prohibiting the transport of slaves into Company territories.

When the United Kingdom abolished slavery in its overseas territories, through the 1833 Slavery Abolition Act, it excluded the non-Crown territories administered by the East India Company from the scope of the statute.

The Indian Slavery Act of 1843 prohibited Company employees from owning, or dealing, along with granting limited protection under the law, that included the ability for a slave to own, transfer or inherit property, notionally benefitting the millions held in Company territory, that in an 1883 article on slavery in India and Egypt, Sir Henry Bartle Frer (who sat on the Viceroy's Council 1859-67), estimated that within the Companies territory, that did not yet extend to half the sub-continent, at the time of the act:

Portugal gradually prohibited the importation of slaves into Portuguese India, following the 1818 Anglo-Portuguese anti slavery treaty, a subsequent 1836 Royal Edict, and a second Anglo-Portuguese treaty in 1842 reduced the external trade, but the institution itself was only prohibited in 1876.

France prohibited slavery, in French India, via the Proclamation of the Abolition of Slavery in the French Colonies, 27 April 1848.

British Indian Empire
Provisions of the Indian Penal Code of 1861 effectively abolished slavery in British India by making the enslavement of human beings a criminal offense. Criminalisation of the institution was required of the princely states, with the likes of the 1861 Anglo-Sikkimese treaty requiring Sikkim to outlaw the institution, though the 1891 census sill recorded slave holdings in the protectorate.

Officials that inadvertently used the term "slave" would be reprimanded, but the actual practices of servitude continued unchanged. Scholar Indrani Chatterjee has termed this "abolition by denial." In the rare cases when the anti-slavery legislation was enforced, it addressed the relatively smaller practices of export and import of slaves, but it did little to address the agricultural slavery that was pervasive inland. The officials in the Madras Presidency turned a blind eye to agricultural slavery claiming that it was a benign form of bondage that was in fact preferable to free labour.

Slaves holdings, in the princely states and protectorates, continued to be recorded, tallied, and published in Census of the India summary books, decades after the institutions notional abolition, in most of the territories of the British Indian Empire. The 1891 summary page for Sikkim noting 124 male, 99 female and 103 child slaves, in the protectorate, thirty years after its prohibition in the territory. Bhutan formally outlawed the institution in the 1950s, and Nepal its Haliya, Haruwa–charuwa, Kamaiya and kamlari systems in the 2000s.

Indian indenture system

After the British government passed legislation which abolished slavery in 1833, the Indian indenture system arose in response to labor demands in regions which had abolished slavery. The indenture system has been compared to slavery by some historians. According to Richard Sheridan, quoting Dookhan, "[the planters] continued to apply or sanction the means of coercion common to slavery, and in this regard the Indians fared no better than the ex-slaves".

In the Indian indenture system, indentured Indian laborers were brought to regions in which slavery had been abolished to replace Africans as laborers on plantations and mines. The first ships carrying indentured labourers left India in 1836. Once they arrived at their destination, they would then be sent to work under various planters or mine owners. Their work and living conditions were frequently just as poor as the slaves they replaced, being frequently confined to their estates and being paid low salaries. Any breach of contract by them brought automatic criminal penalties and imprisonment. Many of the indentured laborers became indentured through fraudulent means, with Indians from inland regions over a thousand kilometers from seaports being promised jobs, were not told the work they were being hired for, or that they would leave their homeland and communities. They were hustled aboard the waiting ships, unprepared for the long and arduous four-month sea journey. Charles Anderson, a special magistrate investigating these sugarcane plantations, wrote to the Colonial Secretary declaring that with few exceptions, the indentured labourers were treated with "great and unjust severity"; planters enforced their Indian laborers in plantations, mining and domestic work harshly, to the extent that decaying remains of deceased laborers were frequently discovered in fields. If labourers protested and refused to work, the planters would refuse to pay and feed them.

Contemporary slavery
According to the 2018 Global Slavery Index, 40.3 million people were enslaved worldwide in 2016. India accounts for almost 8 million or 20%, making it the largest absolute contributor to modern slavery. This typically involves types of forced labor such as bonded labour, child labour, forced marriage, human trafficking, forced begging, and sexual slavery. 

The existence of slavery, especially child slavery, in South Asia and the world has been alleged by various non-governmental organizations (NGO) and media outlets. With the Bonded Labour (Prohibition) Act 1976 and the International Covenant on Civil and Political Rights (concerning slavery and servitude), a spotlight has been placed on these problems in the country. One of the areas identified as problematic is granite quarries.

See also
 Veth (India), a system of forced labour
History of slavery in Asia
Child labour in India
Labour in India

References

Further reading
Singh, Akanksha (2021), "'Enslaved for Life': Construing Slavery in Nineteenth Century India", HumaNetten 47
Scott C. Levi (2002), Hindus Beyond the Hindu Kush: Indians in the Central Asian Slave Trade, Journal of the Royal Asiatic Society
Lal, K. S. (1994), Muslim slave system in medieval India. New Delhi: Aditya Prakashan. 
Salim Kidwai, "Sultans, Eunuchs and Domestics: New Forms of Bondage in Medieval India", in Utsa Patnaik and Manjari Dingwaney (eds), Chains of Servitude: bondage and slavery in India (Madras, 1985).
Utsa Patnaik and Manjari Dingwaney (eds), Chains of Servitude: bondage and slavery in India (Madras, 1985)
Andrea Major (2014), Slavery, Abolitionism and Empire in India, 1772–1843, Liverpool University Press.
R.C. Majumdar, The History and Culture of the Indian People, Bombay.
Andre Wink (1991), Al-Hind: the Making of the Indo-Islamic World, Brill Academic (Leiden), 
KT Rammohan (2009), 'Modern Bondage: Atiyaayma in Post-Abolition Malabar'. in Jan Breman, Isabelle Guerin and Aseem Prakash (eds). India's Unfree Workforce: Of Bondage Old and New. New Delhi: Oxford University Press.

External links
 The law and custom of slavery in British India in a series of letters to Thomas Fowell Buxton, esq., by William Adam., 1840 Open Library
 Modern Slavery, Human bondage in Africa, Asia, and the Dominican Republic
 The Small Hands of Slavery, Bonded Child Labor In India
 India – bonded labour: the gap between illusion and reality
 Child Slaves in Modern India: The Bonded Labor Problem
 Legislative Redress Rather Than Progress? From Slavery to Bondage in Colonial India by Stefan Tetzlaff

 
India
Social history of India
Human rights abuses in India